Sebastian Lander (born 11 March 1991) is a Danish professional road bicycle racer and track cyclist, who last rode for UCI Continental team . In 2012, Lander won the Danish National Road Race Championships.

He joined the World Tour team  for the 2013 and 2014 seasons, riding in the 2013 Vuelta a España.

Major results

2008
 1st Stage 2 Trofeo Karlsberg
 2nd Road race, National Junior Road Championships
 3rd  Road race, UCI Juniors World Championships
2009
 1st Prologue Tre Ciclistica Internazionale Bresciana
 3rd Time trial, National Junior Road Championships
 7th Paris–Roubaix Juniors
2010
 1st Stage 1 Coupe des nations Ville Saguenay
 3rd Liège–Bastogne–Liège U23
 3rd Designa Grand Prix
 8th Road race, UCI Under-23 Road World Championships
 9th Overall Grand Prix du Portugal
2011
 4th La Côte Picarde
 7th Eschborn-Frankfurt City Loop U23
 8th Poreč Trophy
 9th Overall Coupe des nations Ville Saguenay
 9th Handelsbanken Grand Prix
2012
 1st  Road race, National Road Championships
 1st  Road race, National Under-23 Road Championships
 4th Himmerland Rundt
 4th Ster van Zwolle
 5th Dwars door Drenthe
 8th Eschborn-Frankfurt City Loop U23
 9th Grand Prix de la Ville de Lillers
 10th Overall Coupe des nations Ville Saguenay
1st Stage 4
2014
 1st Stage 1 (TTT) Giro del Trentino
 1st  Sprints classification Tour of Britain
2015
 8th Overall Tour du Loir-et-Cher
2018
 6th Veenendaal–Veenendaal Classic

Grand Tour general classification results timeline

References

External links

 

1991 births
Living people
Danish male cyclists
People from Køge Municipality
Sportspeople from Region Zealand